Rawle & Henderson LLP is a law firm headquartered in Philadelphia, Pennsylvania. It is the oldest law firm in continuous practice in the United States. The firm is one of the leading practices in the Philadelphia region, notably in admiralty and maritime law.

Originally named "The Rawle Law Offices", Rawle & Henderson was founded in 1783 by William Rawle. He was a descendant of Francis Rawle, a Quaker merchant and attorney who came from England to the Province of Pennsylvania in 1686. William Rawle started his law practice as the Rawle Law Offices on September 15, 1783. In 1913, the firm was joined by Joseph W. Henderson, and was officially renamed Rawle & Henderson.  In 1917 Henderson became a full partner.

References

External links
 History page on the firm's web site

Law firms based in Pennsylvania
Law firms established in 1783